St. Alexander's Church may refer to:
St. Alexander's Church, Bokion, Albania
Alexander Nevsky Church, Copenhagen, Denmark
St. Alexander Nevsky Church, Riga, Latvia
St. Alexander Nevsky Church, Vilnius, Lithuania
St. Alexander's Church, Warsaw, Poland

See also
Alexander Nevsky Cathedral (disambiguation)
Co-Cathedral of St. Alexander, Kiev